The 24 Hours of Spa is an endurance racing event for cars held annually since 1924 at the Circuit de Spa-Francorchamps, Stavelot, Belgium. It is currently sponsored by TotalEnergies.

History

The Spa 24 Hours was conceived by Jules de Their and Henri Langlois Van Ophem just one year after the inaugural 24 Hours of Le Mans was run. It debuted in 1924 over a  circuit on public roads between the towns of Francorchamps, Malmedy and Stavelot, under the auspices of the Royal Automobile Club of Belgium (RACB). The present  circuit was inaugurated in 1979 with only slight variations since then.

The Spa 24 Hours was part of the European Touring Car Championship from 1966 to 1973, again in 1976 and from 1982 to 1988 (with the exception of 1987 when it was part of the inaugural World Touring Car Championship). The event also counted towards the World Sportscar Championship in 1953 and the World Endurance Championship in 1981. As on the Nürburgring, both a 24h and a 1000 km race is held at Spa, as the 1000 km Spa for sports car racing were introduced in 1966.

Cars entered have spanned from the Russian Moskvitch and models with sub-1 liter engines such as the NSU Prinz TT to the luxurious V8-powered Mercedes-Benz 300 SEL 6.3. Tuned by Mercedes-AMG, the 6834 cc and  so-called "Red pig"  finished as high as second in 1971.

During the 1975 race, Dutch driver Wim Boshuis and a track marshal were killed in two separate incidents. Boshuis was killed when his vehicle collided with other cars on the track, while the track marshal was killed 30 minutes later when Belgian driver Alain Peltier collided with a railing.

The current version of the Spa 24 Hours is an event under the GT World Challenge Europe Powered by AWS and Intercontinental GT Challenge calendar, although it was previously run as part of the FIA GT Championship featuring GT1 and GT2 machinery, and by various touring car series. Currently, the cars run fall under the FIA GT3 and GT3 Cup classifications. It has also been a round of the SRO Group's Intercontinental GT Challenge since its inaugural season in 2016.

2020 saw the race held behind closed doors for the first time.

2023 Belgian Grand Prix, which is part of the 2023 F1 calendar released by FIA on 21 September 2022, is schedule on the race weekend of 28 July to 30 July and clashed with the Spa 24 Hours. This forced the Spa 24 Hours in 2023 to reschedule from its traditional late July race weekend to the race weekend between 29 June to 2 July.

Coupe du Roi
The best manufacturer wins the Coupe du Roi (King's Cup), which is not necessarily the race winners. The cup is won by the manufacturer with the most points, accrued by cars that are made by the same manufacturer. For example, Australian car manufacturer Holden won the Coupe du Roi in 1986 despite their cars finishing the race in 18th, 22nd and 23rd positions outright.

List of winners

Multiple winners

By driver

By manufacturer

See also
 Motorcycle endurance racing series.

Notes

References

External links

TotalEnergies Spa 24 Hours website: Available in English, French and Dutch
1971 results 
1972 results 
1981 results 
FIA GT Website 

 
Sports car races
Touring car races
Auto races in Belgium
World Sportscar Championship races
Endurance motor racing
Recurring sporting events established in 1924
Circuit de Spa-Francorchamps
1924 establishments in Belgium